Circuits Cloud is an online free analog/digital circuits simulator. It is a NGSPICE-based simulator. Circuits Cloud is a cloud-computing-based application, where the user can access the application through the internet, while all their data are stored online. The Circuits Cloud project cost about BD 7000 (around $18.6K). Total development time until the first release was 4 years.

History
Circuits Cloud was created and developed for educational purposes, by Eng. Shaffee Mayoof. The initial release was on 20 June 2014. Circuits Cloud was initially developed as an online digital circuits simulator, but updated later on by Eng. Mayoof and computer engineering students who were candidates in the industrial training program provided by the application owner, Script For Information Technology Solutions,  to support analog circuits simulation.

See also
 Comparison of EDA Software
 List of free electronics circuit simulators

References

External links
 
 Circuits Cloud Youtube

Electronic design automation software
Electronic circuit simulators